Dirges of Elysium is the ninth studio album by the American death metal band Incantation. The album was released in the EU on June 10, 2014, and in the U.S. on June 24.

Track listing

Personnel

Incantation
 John McEntee - Guitars, Vocals
 Alex Bouks - Guitar
 Chuck Sherwood - Bass
 Kyle Severn - Drums

Additional
 Eliran Kantor - Artwork
 Secrets Of The Black Arts - CD/Vinyl layout

References

Incantation (band) albums
2014 albums
Listenable Records albums
Albums with cover art by Eliran Kantor